Sadif (also Romanized as Şadīf; also known as Şadaf Sanchūlī) is a village in Qorqori Rural District, Qorqori District, Hirmand County, Sistan and Baluchestan Province, Iran. At the 2006 census, its population was 91, in 20 families.

References 

Populated places in Hirmand County